A Patient Man is the second studio album by American hardcore punk band Cult Leader. It was released on November 9, 2018, on Deathwish, Inc.

Track listing

Personnel

Cult Leader 
 Michael Mason - Guitar
 Anthony Lucero - Vocals
 Casey Hansen - Drums
 Sam Richards - Bass

Production
 Kurt Ballou – engineering, mixing
 Brad Boatright – mastering
 Maxwell Kreutzelman - lyrics

Artwork and packaging
 Anthony Lucero – artwork
 Jacob Bannon – layout

References

2018 albums
Deathwish Inc. albums
Albums produced by Kurt Ballou
Cult Leader albums